Bengali Buddhists are a religious subgroup of the Bengalis who adhere to or practice the religion of Buddhism. Bengali Buddhist people mainly live in Bangladesh and Indian states West Bengal and Tripura.

Buddhism has a rich ancient heritage in the Bengal. The region was a bastion of the ancient Buddhist Mauryan and Palan empires, when the Mahayana and Vajrayana schools flourished. South-Eastern Bengal was ruled by the medieval Buddhist Kingdom of Mrauk U during the 16th and 17th centuries. The British Raj influenced the emergence of modern community.

Today, Bengali Buddhists are followers of Theravāda Buddhism.

History

Ancient Bengal was a center of Buddhist learning and art. Buddhist artifacts have been excavated throughout the region, particularly in Wari-Bateshwar, Chandraketugarh, Paharpur, Mahasthangarh and Mainamati. The Mauryan Empire led by Ashoka extended its suzerainty to the region in the 2nd century BCE. Ashoka played an important role in propagating Buddhism in his own empire and the wider ancient world. Mauryan rule was succeeded by the Buddhist Samatata maritime kingdom in Bengal.

Successive Buddhist powers tussled for dominance with Hindu and Jain kings in the Indian subcontinent. The Bengali Buddhist Pala Empire arose during the 8th century. Founded by the election of Buddhist chieftain Gopala circa 750 CE, the empire grew into one of the largest imperial powers in classical Asia. The Palas promoted Mahayana and Tantric Buddhism. They patronized the creation of many outstanding temples, monasteries and works of art. The Palas enjoyed strong relations with the Abbasid Caliphate, the Tibetan Empire and the Srivijaya Empire. The empire reached its peak under Dharmapala and Devapala. They reigned for four centuries until being replaced by the resurgent Hindu Sena dynasty. According to  Muhammad Ghulam Rasul,  Brahmin persecution played a key role in the decline of Buddhism in India; followed by later Muslim conquest.

Remnants of Buddhist communities continued to flourish in southeastern Bengal. The Buddhist Kingdom of Mrauk U ruled the region during the 16th and 17th centuries.

By the late 18th century, the region was ceded to the British Empire. During this period, a revival movement developed  that led to the development of two orders of Theravada monks, the Sangharaj Nikaya and the Mahasthabir Nikaya.

Demographics

Bangladesh is home to the predominant section of the Bengali Buddhist community. They usually enjoy a high literacy rate and are found in the Bangladeshi middle class, particularly in the port city of Chittagong. Many members of the community reside in Dhaka, Cox's Bazar and Comilla. The eastern Indian state capitals of Agartala and Kolkata also have significant Bengali Buddhist communities.

Bengali Buddhists constitute 0.59% of the population in Bangladesh. According to the 2011 India census, Bengali Buddhists constitute 0.3% or 282,898 of the population in West Bengal. Buddhists constitute 3.41% or 125,182 of the population in Tripura.

Culture

Art
Buddhist art flourished under the Pala rulers. The art for their period is termed Pala art. It influenced art outside of India as well. The artistic tradition continued under the Sena rulers, and thus the term "Pala-Sena" is sometimes used.

Festivals
Buddha's Birthday is a public holiday in Bangladesh & state government holiday in West Bengal.

Bengali Buddhists also celebrate the festival of Madhu Purnima.\
Kathin civar dana(Holy robe offering ceremony)is celebrated month long in October-November by Bengali Buddhists.

Literature
Bipradash Barua is a Bangladeshi author and novelist.

Music
Partha Barua is one of the pioneers of Bangladeshi rock.

Notable Bengali Buddhists

Indians

 Shraddha Das

Pre-partition Indians
 Atisa - 10th century Buddhist monk who played a prominent role in the spread of Buddhism to Tibet. Also an abbot at Vikramashila monastery.
 Chandragomin - 7th century Buddhist lay practitioner and poet from the Varendra region
 Traillokyachandra - 10th century King of the Chandra dynasty who converted to Vajrayana Buddhism                                               
Bangladeshis

Bhikkhus (monks)

 Karmayogi Kripasaran Mahathero
 Ven. Jyotipal Mahathero
 Rajguru Aggavamsa Mahathera
 U Pannya Jota Mahathera|Ven. U Pannya Jota Mahathera
 Ven. Prajnananda Mahathera
 Suddhananda Mahathero
 Bishuddhananda Mahathera

Administration

Barrister Devasish Roy, Chakma Raja (Chakma Circle Chief)
Bijoy Giri (15th Chakma Raja of Chakma Circle)
Benita Roy (Aristocrat, litterateur, diplomat, minister and Rani of Chakma Circle)
Raja Nalinaksha Roy (49th Raja Of Chakma Circle)
Mong Prue Sain (King of Mong Circle)

Freedom Fighters
UK Ching, Bir Bikram

Politics

Dilip Barua (Communist Party of Bangladesh (Marxist–Leninist) (Barua)). Former Minister of Industries.
Jyotirindra Bodhipriya Larma
Manabendra Narayan Larma
Charu Bikash Chakma
Kalparanjan Chakma
Ma Mya Ching
Aung Shwe Prue Chowdhury
Sacing Prue Jerry
Maa Ma Ching Marma

Arts and literature

 Benimadhab Barua
 Kanak Chanpa Chakma, artist
Bipradash Barua, author
Partha Barua, singer, lead vocal and guitarist of Souls Band
Sukumar Barua
Subrata Barua
Ratan Talukder, Actor and martial artist

Education
Bikiran Prasad Barua
Sukomal Barua
Amit Chakma
Aye Thein Rakhaine, Academic and Politician

Sports
Debabrata Barua, cricket
Debashish Barua, cricket
Sumon Barua, cricket
Monika Chakma, football
Rupna Chakma, football
Anai Mogini, football
Anuching Mogini, football
Maria Manda, football
Ritu Porna Chakma, football
Sura Krishna Chakma, professional boxer
Aungmraching Marma, football
Champa Chakma, cricket

See also
Theravāda
Pāli Canon
Buddhism in India
Buddhism in Bangladesh
Marathi Buddhists
Kripasaran Mahathera

References

 
Indian Buddhists
Demographics of Bangladesh
Demographics of India
Buddhist communities of Bangladesh
Buddhist communities of India